These are the Billboard magazine Hot Dance Club Play number one hits of 1975.

Note: Billboard magazine's dance/disco chart, which began in 1974 and ranked the popularity of tracks in New York City discothèques, expanded to feature multiple charts each week which highlighted playlists in various cities such as San Francisco,  Los Angeles, Miami, Chicago, Boston, Phoenix, Detroit and Houston.  During this time, Billboard rival publication Record World was the first to compile a dance chart which incorporated club play on a national level.  Noted Billboard statistician Joel Whitburn has since "adopted" Record World chart data from the weeks between March 29, 1975 and August 21, 1976 into Billboards club play history.  For the sake of continuity, Record World national charts are incorporated into the 1975 and 1976 lists.

With the issue dated August 28, 1976, Billboard premièred its own national chart ("National Disco Action Top 30") and their data is used from this date forward.

See also
1975 in music
List of number-one dance hits (United States)
List of artists who reached number one on the U.S. Dance chart

References
Citations

Sources

Some weeks may also be found at Billboard magazine courtesy of Google Books: 1975—1979.

1975
1975 record charts
1975 in American music